Ilya Zhitomirskiy (12 October 1989 – 12 November 2011) was a Russian-American software developer and entrepreneur. Zhitomirskiy was a co-founder and developer of the Diaspora social network and the Diaspora free software that powers it.

Biography

Early life
Zhitomirskiy was born on 12 October 1989, in Moscow, Soviet Union, to Alexei Medovikov and Inna Zhitomirskaya. Both his father and maternal grandfather are mathematicians. In 2000, his family emigrated to the United States, eventually settling outside Philadelphia, where he graduated from Lower Merion High School in 2007. Zhitomirskiy first attended Acton-Boxborough Regional High School in Acton, Massachusetts. He then studied mathematics, economics and computer science at Tulane University, University of Maryland, and New York University. In his free time, Zhitomirskiy unicycled and was a competitive ballroom dancer.

Diaspora
At NYU, he studied computer science at The Courant Institute of Mathematical Sciences, where he met the three friends with whom he founded diaspora*, a social networking service, in 2010. The project was conceived after the founders had attended a lecture by Columbia Law School professor and free software activist Eben Moglen in February 2010 about the threat to privacy posed by commercial Internet services. According to Moglen, Zhitomirskiy was "immensely talented" and "the most idealistic of the group... He had a choice between graduate school and this project, and he chose to do the project because he wanted to do something with his time that would make freedom".

Death
On the evening of 12 November 2011, Zhitomirskiy was found dead in his San Francisco home by police responding to calls about a suspected suicide. An autopsy report from the Medical Examiner's office formally ruled the death as a suicide in April 2012. He died from an intentional inert gas asphyxiation using helium. While press reports questioned whether the pressure of working on Diaspora had led to his suicide, Diaspora co-founder Maxwell Salzberg disagreed. Salzberg stated, "Yes, I agree that being a startup founder is stressful. But it wasn’t the stress of work that killed Ilya. He had his own issues. He was sick." Zhitomirskiy’s mother, Inna Zhitomirskiy, did not comment on reports of his history of mental illness, but she did say on his participation in Diaspora, "I strongly believe that if Ilya did not start this project and stayed in school, he would be well and alive today."

The Village Voice said that Zhitomirskiy was "often described as the most idealistic and privacy-conscious member of the group" and declared his death "a devastating setback" for Diaspora.

References

External links

 .
 
 
 Personal Website on GitHub

1989 births
2011 suicides
21st-century American businesspeople
American computer programmers
American technology company founders
Courant Institute of Mathematical Sciences alumni
Free software programmers
Lower Merion High School alumni
Russian emigrants to the United States
Suicides in California